Hans Jordaens may refer to:

Hans Jordaens (1555–1630), a Flemish Baroque painter
Hans III Jordaens (1590–1643), a Flemish Baroque painter
Hans IV Jordaens (1616–1680), a Dutch Golden Age painter